Johannes Høsflot Klæbo (born 22 October 1996) is a Norwegian cross-country skier who represents Byåsen IL. He holds multiple records, most notably for being the youngest male in history to win the FIS Cross-Country World Cup, the Tour de Ski, a World Championship event, and an Olympic event in cross-country skiing.

During the 2019–2020 World Cup season, Klæbo became the most successful male sprinter in World Cup history in terms of individual race victories and set a new record for the most overall sprint titles, with 4. He is currently the most successful male overall race winner in the competition's history.

Klæbo won three gold medals at the 2018 Winter Olympics, in his debut Olympic appearance.

Athletic career

2015–16: World Cup debut
Klæbo made his debut in the World Cup in the 2015–16 season in the classic sprint in Drammen, Norway on 3 February 2016. He finished 15th in the race.

2016–17: Breakthrough season
In the following 2016–17 season, Klæbo achieved his first World Cup podium after finishing third in the classic sprint in Ruka, Finland, on 26 November 2016. Later in the 2016–17 season, on 18 February 2017, Klæbo got his first World Cup victory when he won the sprint freestyle in Otepää, Estonia. He competed at the FIS Nordic World Ski Championships 2017 in Lahti, Finland, winning a bronze medal at the Men's sprint competition. On 17 March 2017 in Quebec City he won his first small crystal globe in the Sprint World Cup and also won the Helvetia U23 overall ranking after winning the end-of-season mini tour. He finished his second World Cup season with three victories.

2017–18: Olympic success and World Cup overall
Klæbo participated in his first Olympics at the 2018 Winter Olympics in PyeongChang, South Korea. Before the Olympics, he had nine victories in the 2017–18 World Cup. He made his Olympic debut by finishing 10th in the men's skiathlon event. On 13 February 2018 he became an Olympic champion after winning the men's sprint. This victory made him the youngest ever male to win an Olympic event in cross-country skiing. He skied the last leg on the Norwegian teams that won both the 4 × 10-kilometre relay and the men's team sprint. A steep hill on the Olympic course was dubbed "Klæbo-bakken" ("Klæbo hill") by Norwegian media after Klæbo overtook his competitors several times in this climb throughout the games. With three gold medals, he tied with French biathlete Martin Fourcade for most gold medals won in the games.

Klæbo won the overall 2017–18 World Cup with a gap of 119 points down to Dario Cologna, making him the youngest ever winner of the World Cup. He also beat the record for the most sprint victories in a single World Cup season, with seven wins.

2018–19: Tour de Ski, World Championships, and second World Cup overall
Klæbo won the 2018–19 Tour de Ski in his first appearance in the Tour. 22 years and 76 days old, he became the youngest skier to win the overall Tour de Ski.

Klæbo won three gold medals at the 2019 World Championships in Seefeld in Tirol, Austria. He started the championships with a World Championship title in the individual sprint. By winning the sprint, Klæbo became the youngest male winner of a World Championship race in cross-country skiing. He finished 30th in the skiathlon after not keeping up at the classic part of the race. The result at the skiatlon made Klæbo give away his spot at the 15-kilometre classic to Sjur Røthe. Together with Emil Iversen, Klæbo won the team sprint after beating Russia's Alexander Bolshunov in the last stages of the final leg. On 1 March, Klæbo raced the 4th leg on Norway's team who won the 4 × 10-kilometre relay on the second-to-last event of the championships.

Klæbo won the overall 2018–19 World Cup and extended his own record of most sprint victories in a single World Cup season, with eight wins. He also leveled Emil Jönsson's all-time World Cup record of most sprint victories, with 16 wins, and tied with Emil Jönsson and Ola Vigen Hattestad for the most overall sprint titles, with 3.

2019–20: Hand injury and fourth World Cup sprint title
After a shorter season as a result of the COVID-19 pandemic, as well as a hand injury resulting in a short absence from competing, Klæbo placed second overall in the 2019–20 World Cup. He also placed third in the 2019–20 Tour de Ski and achieved his best end-of-season ranking in the distance discipline, placing sixth. Klæbo also won his fourth overall sprint title, thereby setting the record for most overall sprint titles in history. He also overtook Emil Jönsson's all-time World Cup record of most individual sprint victories, extending his own record to 24.

2020–21: Pandemic-disrupted World Cup and World Championship success
Klæbo enjoyed a strong start to the 2020–21 season at the Nordic Opening in Ruka, taking second in the opening sprint competition before winning the 15 km classic and clinching the Ruka Triple overall after the pursuit. However, the next World Cup stop on home snow in Lillehammer was cancelled due to the ongoing COVID-19 pandemic, and the race programme of Klæbo and his team-mates was further disrupted after the Norwegian, Swedish and Finnish teams elected not to compete in the subsequent World Cup rounds in December due to concerns regarding the risks of the pandemic and then also withdrew from the Tour de Ski after the three Nordic nations' request for the race to be shortened were refused by the International Ski Federation. Whilst the rest of the Norwegian team returned to the World Cup circuit at the first post-Tour meeting in Lahti, Klæbo elected to return at the next round in Falun at the end of January. In Falun he finished second in the 15 km classic mass start, being pipped in the final sprint by Bolshunov, before taking the win in the classic sprint.

At the World Championships in Oberstdorf, Klæbo started his campaign by successfully defending his title in the sprint, leading home team-mates Erik Valnes and Håvard Solås Taugbøl in a clean sweep of the podium positions for Norway, becoming the first man to win consecutive sprint world titles and the second skier overall, after fellow Norwegian Marit Bjørgen. He took his second gold medal of the championships in the team sprint alongside Valnes, overcoming a 4.3 second deficit going into the final lap of the race and attacking on the final climb to secure the win by 1.68 seconds. Klæbo secured another gold in the relay, where he took the anchor leg after team-mates Pål Golberg, Hans Christer Holund and Emil Iversen, holding off Bolshunov for the win. However, he missed out on a fourth title at the worlds when he was disqualified in the 50 km classic after being first to cross the finish line, as he was judged to have obstructed Bolshunov in the final sprint, handing the victory to team-mate Iversen. At the last meeting of the World Cup season in Engadin, Klæbo finished second in the 15 km behind Bolshunov and fourth in the 50 km freestyle pursuit. He finished third in the season's overall World Cup standings.

He was awarded the Holmenkollen Medal in 2022.

Cross-country skiing results
All results are sourced from the International Ski Federation (FIS).

Olympic Games
7 medals – (5 gold, 1 silver, 1 bronze)

Distance reduced to 30 km due to weather conditions.

World Championships
12 medals – (9 gold, 2 silver, 1 bronze)

World Cup

Season titles
 10 titles – (3 overall, 4 sprint, 3 U23)

Season standings

Individual podiums
64 victories – (38 , 26 )
86 podiums – (55 , 31 )

Team podiums
 3 victories – (2 , 1 ) 
 3 podiums – (2 , 1 )

Personal life
Klæbo was born in Oslo, the capital of Norway. He lived there until he was five years old before he and his family moved to Trondheim. He grew up there and still lives there today. Klæbo is very close to his family and spends a lot of time with them. His father, Haakon Klæbo, is his manager and his grandfather, Kåre Høsflot, is his coach.

Outside sports, Klæbo and his younger brother, Ola, run a YouTube channel where they upload weekly vlogs about Klæbo's everyday life as an athlete. He started his channel because he wanted people to see what cross-country skiers do outside competitions and off-season. His siblings help him out by editing and translating the videos. As of October 2019, Klæbo has over 102,000 subscribers on his YouTube channel and totals over 12 million views from over 100 videos.

He was a part of Norway's elite sprint team until mid-2019, when he became a part of Norway's men's elite allround team. He switched back to the elite sprint team before the 2020–21 FIS Cross-Country World Cup season.

Klæbo was given a non-custodial prison sentence of 16 days and a fine of NOK 10,000 by Sør-Trøndelag district court on 5 March 2019, following a road traffic accident on 12 December 2018, where he collided with a stationary car at a pedestrian crossing.

References

External links

 
 

1996 births
Living people
Sportspeople from Trondheim
Norwegian male cross-country skiers
FIS Nordic World Ski Championships medalists in cross-country skiing
FIS Cross-Country World Cup champions
Cross-country skiers at the 2018 Winter Olympics
Cross-country skiers at the 2022 Winter Olympics
Olympic cross-country skiers of Norway
Medalists at the 2018 Winter Olympics
Medalists at the 2022 Winter Olympics
Olympic gold medalists for Norway
Olympic silver medalists for Norway
Olympic bronze medalists for Norway
Olympic medalists in cross-country skiing
Tour de Ski skiers
Tour de Ski winners